Betsy Doon Hassett (born 4 August 1990) is a New Zealand footballer who plays as an attacking midfielder or a right winger for the New Zealand women's national football team and New Zealand club Wellington Phoenix. She has previously played for German side SC Sand, English club Manchester City, Amazon Grimstad in Norway, Werder Bremen in Germany's Frauen-Bundesliga, Dutch club Ajax and Icelandic clubs KR and Stjarnan. Hassett represented New Zealand at the 2011 and 2015 FIFA Women's World Cup as well as the 2012 and 2016 Summer Olympics. At youth level, she played at the 2008 and 2010 FIFA U-20 Women's World Cup tournaments.

Early life
Born in the Auckland suburb of Titirangi, Hassett began playing football at the age of four with her brothers. She was captain of Avondale College First XI Girls Football team in 2008 and led them to third place at the National Schools Tournament.

University of California, Berkeley Golden Bears, 2009–2012
Hassett attended the University of California, Berkeley where she played for the California Golden Bears from 2009 to 2012. Due to injuries, Hassett had limited playing time in her first year but in her second year she played in 15 games, starting 11 and was the sole Bear on the Pac-10 all-academic second team. During her junior year, she played in all 22 matches with 18 starts in the midfield. She was a Second-Team All-Pac-12 selection and Third Team NSCAA Scholar All-American. She was also named to the 2011 Pac-12 All-Academic team. As a senior, Hassett started in nineteen of the twenty regular season games. From her central mid-field position she scored 6 goals and assisted on 5 goals. She was one of only two California players earning highest All Pac-12 honours by being named to the All-Pac-12 First Team.

Club career
Hassett signed for German second tier side SC Sand in 2013. She scored 11 goals in her ten appearances for the club during the 2012–13 season. SC Sand finished in third place during the regular season with a  record.

In 2014, Hassett signed for Manchester City in England. Of her signing, she said, "I like the idea of being part of a side that's entering the FA WSL for the first time. This way we can start from scratch with a new style and I can play to my strengths rather than trying to adapt to an already existing and established environment." Hassett started in 11 of the 13 matches in which she played. Manchester finished its inaugural season in the FA Women's Super League (FA WSL) in fifth place with a  record.

Hassett played for Norwegian Toppserien club Amazon Grimstad during the 2015 season. The club was facing the threat of relegation as the last place team in the league. Hassett made 11 appearances for the club and scored a goal in the team's 2–0 win over Medkila. The team finished in last place with a  record.

After signing with SV Werder Bremen in the German Frauen-Bundesliga for the 2015–16 season, Hassett made eight starts in her ten appearances for the club. During a match against SC Freiburg on 20 March 2016, she scored the game-winning goal. The club finished in 11th place with a  record.

In July 2016, Hassett transferred to Ajax in the Netherlands' Eredivisie for the 2016–17 season. Ajax finished in first place during the regular season with a   record 15 points ahead of the second place team. After winning the championship, Ajax secured a spot in the 2017–18 UEFA Women's Champions League, a first for the club.

In July 2017, Hassett signed with Úrvalsdeild kvenna club KR. After three seasons with KR, she signed with Stjarnan in March 2020.

In July 2022, after 14 years playing abroad, Hassett returned to her homeland, signing with New Zealand's only professional women's club Wellington Phoenix.

International career

Youth
Hassett was a member of the New Zealand squad in the 2008 FIFA U-20 Women's World Cup playing all three group games; a 3–2 loss to Nigeria, a 4–3 win over hosts Chile and a 1–1 draw with England. In 2010, she played all three group games in the 2010 FIFA U-20 Women's World Cup

Senior
Hassett made her senior Football Ferns debut in a 1–0 win over Argentina on 16 June 2008. She played in Germany at the 2011 FIFA Women's World Cup with New Zealand, seeing time in all three games. In 2012, she represented her country at the London Olympics, helping the Football Ferns become the first New Zealand team to advance to the second round in a major FIFA tournament. She played in all four games with three starts. Hassett featured in all three of New Zealand's matches at the 2015 FIFA Women's World Cup in Canada.  She also featured in all three of New Zealand's matches at the 2016 Olympics. On 24 July 2021, Hassett scored one goal in New Zealand's 6–1 loss against the United States in 2020 Olympics.

International goals

Honours
Manchester City
 Women's Super League Cup: 2014
	
Ajax
 Eredivisie: 2016–17
 KNVB Women's Cup: 2016–17
 OFC Women's Nations Cup: 2014

Individual
 IFFHS OFC Woman Team of the Decade 2011–2020

See also
  Foreign players in the FA WSL
 List of New Zealand women's international footballers
 New Zealand at the 2012 Summer Olympics
 List of AFC Ajax (women) players

References

External links
 
 
 
Cal Berkeley Golden Bears player profile

1990 births
Living people
2011 FIFA Women's World Cup players
2015 FIFA Women's World Cup players
2019 FIFA Women's World Cup players
AFC Ajax (women) players
Amazon Grimstad players
Association footballers from Auckland
California Golden Bears women's soccer players
Eredivisie (women) players
Footballers at the 2012 Summer Olympics
Women's Super League players
FIFA Century Club
Footballers at the 2016 Summer Olympics
Footballers at the 2020 Summer Olympics
Frauen-Bundesliga players
Expatriate women's footballers in England
Expatriate women's footballers in Germany
Expatriate women's footballers in Iceland
Expatriate women's footballers in the Netherlands
Betsy Hassett
Manchester City W.F.C. players
New Zealand expatriate sportspeople in England
New Zealand expatriate sportspeople in Germany
New Zealand expatriate sportspeople in the Netherlands
New Zealand women's association footballers
New Zealand women's international footballers
Olympic association footballers of New Zealand
SV Werder Bremen (women) players
Betsy Hassett
Toppserien players
Betsy Hassett
SC Sand players
Women's association football midfielders
Wellington Phoenix FC (A-League Women) players
New Zealand expatriate women's association footballers
Expatriate women's footballers in Norway
New Zealand expatriate sportspeople in Norway
Expatriate women's soccer players in the United States
New Zealand expatriate sportspeople in the United States
New Zealand expatriate sportspeople in Iceland